Sioux Blood is a 1929 American silent Western film directed by John Waters. It stars Western action star Tim McCoy. A print is preserved at the George Eastman House in New York.

Cast
 Tim McCoy as Flood
 Robert Frazer as Lone Eagle
 Ena Gregory as Barbara Ingram (* as Marian Douglas)
 Clarence Geldart as Miles Ingram (* as Clarence Geldert)
 Chief John Big Tree as Crazy Wolf(* as Chief Big Tree)
 Sidney Bracey as Cheyenne Jones(* as Sidney Bracy)

References

External links
 
 
 long style lobby poster(Wayback Machine)

1929 films
1929 Western (genre) films
Films directed by John Waters (director born 1893)
Metro-Goldwyn-Mayer films
American black-and-white films
Silent American Western (genre) films
1920s American films